The hussar regiment was a formation (military unit, regiment) of the light cavalry of the Army of the Russian Kingdom and the Russian Imperial Army of the Armed Forces of the Kingdom and the Empire.

The regiments of this type of weapon were intended for reconnaissance, raiding, sentry and liaison services. In the campaign, the subunits of the hussar regiment invariably were part of the vanguard and rearguard, hiding the movement of the main troops of the active formation, conducting reconnaissance of the enemy's actions. And in combat, fighting or battle, they were entrusted with pursuing the retreating (fleeing) enemy, and if their troops failed, to cover the withdrawal of the main troops. Hussar regiments were indispensable for actions on enemy lines of communication in the "parties".

History 

In Russia, the hussar formations (companies) as the troops of the "New (Foreign) System" are mentioned in 1634. By 1654, these companies were deployed into a regiment under the command of Colonel Christopher Rylsky. In the spring of 1654, Rylsky's hussar regiment solemnly leaves Moscow, but a year later it disappears from the documents. Probably, it did not justify itself and was transferred to the Reitar Order.

In September 1660, the hussar companies were organized in the Novgorod Grade by Prince Ivan Khovansky. These companies showed themselves splendidly in the battles of the Russian–Polish War and in August 1661 they were deployed into a regiment, which received "hussar shafts" (spears) and armour from the Armoury. Gordon's diary speaks of three companies of hussars who participated in the Kozhukhov Campaign in 1694. The last mention of the hussars of this organization falls on 1701, when the hussars were recruited into the Novgorod Dragoon Regiment. There was also the Consolidated Lance–Reitar–Hussar Regiment of the steward and Colonel Yakov Chelishchev. In 1701, this consolidated formation operated in the area of the Pechersky Monastery "to save the district peasants of the Pskov Uyezd", later it was reorganized into a garrison dragoon regiment, and in the period from 1713 to 1715 was in Smolensk.

Russian hussars, led in 1654 by Colonel Christopher Rylsky, wore wings. The Armoury has preserved Russian hussar armour of the 17th century. Russian hussars could also be supplied with Reitar Armour. So, for example, Prince Khovansky did in 1661, when he did not have time to receive the hussar armour. As the prince wrote: "I have accepted 360 plates in the regiment. Of this number, 91 plates were given to the hussar, while by your (royal) decree, hussar armor will be sent to me, and the remaining 269 plates were given to the regiment of Colonel Davyd Zybin to the reitars... And hussar armor and shishaks did not come to my regiment in July until the 7th, and a hussar cannot be without armor and shishaks and without handcuffs".

In April 1707, Peter I instructed the Serbian Colonel Apostle Kichich to form a regiment of hussars from Wallachian, Serbian and other South Slavic immigrants living in Southern Russia (Novorossiya). As a result, the so–called "Volosh Khorongv" or Hussar Volosh Regiments were formed:
Colonel Apostle Kichich;
Colonel Vasily Tansky;
Colonel Mikhail Brashevyan;
Colonel Serbin.

Participated in the Northern War.

By the time of the Prut Campaign in 1711, the number of Serbian, Wallachian and Polish hussars' regiments had increased to six. After the campaign, these regiments were reorganized into two hussar regiments. Later, 1,500 Wallachian hussars were left in Russian service, of which three regiments were formed:
Colonel Apostle Kichich;
Colonel Vasily Tansky;
Colonel Serbin.

They existed until 1721, when they were disbanded, after the conclusion of the Nystadt Peace Treaty, due to the high cost of their maintenance as mercenary units and their indiscipline.

But in October 1723, Emperor Peter I, by a personal decree, ordered the Serbian Major Ivan Albanezov (Albanez) to form a Serbian Hussar Regiment of 316 people (of which 285 are privates). It was not possible to recruit a regiment according to the state, and in 1726 the personnel were distributed among the suburban regiments, but the next year they were reassembled, allocating land for settlement on the outskirts of Russia (Ukraine) and ordering to increase the staff to 1,000 people, taking the missing six hundred from suburban regiments. On September 3, 1728, the staff was reduced to 600 people, the number of Serbs had to be replenished at the expense of young Cherkassians. In 1729, the regiment was settled on the territory between the fortress Tor and the Ukrainian Line.

By 1733, the regiment had 197 personnel (130 privates), in connection with which the regiment commander Ivan Stoyanov took active measures to recruit Serbs – in particular, in the Austrian region of the Holy Roman Empire.

In 1736, in connection with the outbreak of the Russian–Turkish War, the staff of the regiment was brought to 1,160 people in 10 companies. In 1737, in addition to the Little Russian and Zaporozhye (Cherkasy) Cossacks, it was allowed to accept Hungarians, Wallachians, Transylvanians and Moldavians into the regiment. By 1740, the regiment numbered 1,045. The Serbian Hussar Regiment took part in the storming of Ochakov, battles at the Prut River and Khotin.

On October 14, 1741, by decree of Anna Leopoldovna, the composition of the four existing hussar regiments (Serbian, Hungarian, Moldavian and Georgian) was brought to a uniformity: 963 people in 10 companies. The regiments are assigned the colors of the uniforms.

In 1764, two Pandur Regiments, together with the Novomirgorod Garrison and Serbian hussars, were reorganized into three settled cavalry regiments: the Black and Yellow Hussars and the Elisavetgrad Pikiner Regiments.

On December 24, 1776, it was indicated that nine hussar regiments were formed on the territory of the Azov and Novorossiya Governorates to protect the southern borders of the empire, from the frame of the abolished cavalry units:

Slavic;
Illyric;
Serbian;
Bulgarian;
Dalmatian;
Wallachian;
Moldavian;
Macedonian;
Hungarian.

The Serbian Hussar Regiment in 1783 entered the formation of the Olviopol Hussar Regiment.

In 1783, the Highest decision was made and the army hussar regiments were renamed into light horse regiments and became part of the Yekaterinoslav Cavalry. During the period of the All–Russian Emperor Paul the First, four regiments were disbanded, and their personnel went to replenish the field regiments, six were renamed as hussars, and one as cuirassier.

During the First Patriotic War of 1812, the hussar formations served as the basis for the creation of a number of partisan detachments (detachments of light cavalry), which delivered surprise attacks on the communications of European troops. For the courage and heroism of the personnel of the hussar formations shown in battles against the troops of Europe united by Napoleon, four regiments of hussars were awarded the George Standards, 9 regiments – George and Silver Pipes, 10 regiments – the badges "For Distinction" on the shako, and the Grodno Hussar Regiment for distinctions in battle in the area of Klyastitsa was renamed to Klyastitsky General Yakov Kulnev Regiment.

Later, the hussar regiments took part in the abroad campaigns of the Russian Army in 1813–1814, in the Russian–Turkish War of 1877–1878. In 1883, the Supreme decision was again made to rename the regiments, this time to dragoon regiments. During the military reform of Nicholas II in 1907, some regiments were given back the name of the hussars. Before the Imperialist War, there were 20 hussar regiments in the Armed Forces of the Russian Empire. Later, the following hussar formations remained in the Russian Imperial Army:

Grodno Hussar Regiment;
Elisavetgrad Hussar Regiment;
Izyum Hussar Regiment;
Sumy Hussar Regiment;
Alexandrian Hussar Regiment;
Akhtyrsky Hussar Regiment;
Irkutsk Hussar Regiment;
Mariupol Hussar Regiment;
Belarusian Hussar Regiment;
Lubensky Hussar Regiment;
Olviopol Hussar Regiment;
Pavlograd Hussar Regiment;
Chernigov Hussar Regiment.

In the Russian Guard, by the beginning of the 20th century, there were two guards hussar regiments:
Life Guards of His Majesty;
Life Guards Grodno.

During the Great Russian Troubles, 1917–1918, in the Russian Armed Forces, hussar regiments were disbanded.

Form of clothing of the regiments

Gallery

References

Sources 
Hussars // Brockhaus and Efron Encyclopedic Dictionary: in 86 Volumes (82 Volumes and 4 Additional) – Saint Petersburg, 1890–1907
Foreign Troops in Russian Service // Military Encyclopedia: in 18 Volumes / Edited by Vasily Novitsky ... and Others – Saint Petersburg; Moscow: Printing House of the Ivan Sytin Partnership, 1911–1915
Novorossiysk Territory // Brockhaus and Efron Encyclopedic Dictionary: in 86 Volumes (82 Volumes and 4 Additional) – Saint Petersburg, 1890–1907
Ekaterinoslav Cavalry // Military Encyclopedia: in 18 Volumes / Edited by Vasily Novitsky ... and Others – Saint Petersburg; Moscow: Printing House of the Ivan Sytin Partnership, 1911–1915
Ariadna Bazhova. Russian–Yugoslav Relations in the Second Half of the 18th Century – Moscow, 1982
Nikolay Markevich. Osip Khrustalev. History of Little Russia – Moscow: 1842–1843. Volume 1–5
Alexander Viskovatov. Historical Description of the Clothing and Weapons of the Russian Troops from Ancient Times to 1855. (Volumes 1–30 – Saint Petersburg, 1841–1862; Second Edition – Volumes 1–34. Saint Petersburg – Novosibirsk – Leningrad, 1899–1948) – was awarded in 1842 the Half Demidov Prize

External links 
Pyotr Kosmolinsky. Hussars of Elizaveta Petrovna (1741–1762). Military–Historical Commission – 4. Moscow, 1988

Cavalry regiments of the Russian Empire